Iyambo is a surname. Notable people with the name include:

Abraham Iyambo (1961–2013), Namibian politician
Nickey Iyambo (born  1936), Namibian politician and physician
Patrick Iyambo (1939–1991), Namibian politician 
Tupa Iyambo (born        ), Senior SHE practitioner at NamPower

See also
Dr Abraham Iyambo Senior Secondary School, is a school in the Ohangwena Region of northern Namibia